The principal of generic views in the study of cognition stipulates that the interpretation made by an observer of a distal phenomenon should be such as to not require that the observer be in a special position to,  or relationship with, the phenomenon in question.  The principal is a fairly general account of the inductive bias that allows an observer to reconstruct distal phenomena from an impoverished proximal datum.  This principle has been advanced particularly in vision research as an account of how, for example, three-dimensional structure is extracted from an inadequate two-dimensional projection.

The principal of generic views has been discussed by Richards and Hoffman, and has been given a sophisticated Bayesian formalization by Freeman.

Relation to Bayesian inference
Another expression of the generic views principal is that the inference of distal structure should be such that the inference would remain substantially the same if the "position" of the observer were moderately altered (perturbed).  If the inference made would have been qualitatively or categorically different under a perturbation of the observer, then the inference does not satisfy the generic views assumption, and should be rejected.  (The question of what constitutes a qualitative or categorical difference is an interesting point of detail.)  On this view, it can be argued that the principal of generic views is nothing more than an inference based on the maximum posterior probability (MAP) which accounts for aspects of observation.  Thus, we infer the distal phenomenon which possess the highest probability of having generated the observations in question, and this probability incorporates (in addition to relevant priors) both the likelihood of the distal phenomenon generating certain observable signals, and the likelihood of the observer transducing those signals in a manner consistent with the observations.  On such an analysis (and with various assumptions invoked), one can obtain a behavior approximating the generic views principal.

Notes

References

Further reading
.
 .
 .
.
.
.

Cognition